The Football League play-offs for the 1992–93 season were held in May 1993, with the finals taking place at Wembley Stadium in London. The play-off semi-finals were played over two legs and were contested by the teams who finished in 3rd, 4th, 5th and 6th place in the Football League First Division and Football League Second Division and the 4th, 5th, 6th, and 7th placed teams in the Football League Third Division table. The winners of the semi-finals progressed through to the finals, with the winner of these matches gaining promotion for the following season.

Background
The Football League play-offs have been held every year since 1987. They take place for each division following the conclusion of the regular season and are contested by the four clubs finishing below the automatic promotion places.

First Division

Portsmouth, whose top scorer Guy Whittingham had found the net 42 times in Division One, only missed out on automatic promotion on goal difference. Fourth placed Tranmere Rovers had recorded the highest finish of their history and had yet to play in the top flight of English football. Swindon Town, who finished fifth, had won the playoff final three years earlier but promotion was then withdrawn due to financial irregularities. The last playoff place went to the previous season's beaten finalists, Leicester City.

In the end, it was Leicester and Swindon who went through to the final. Swindon took a 3-0 lead before Leicester clawed back to make it 3-3, only for Paul Bodin to score the winner and deliver top flight football to Swindon for the first time in their history.

Glenn Hoddle's impressive two-year spell as player-manager of Swindon attracted attention of bigger clubs, and soon after this famous victory he was appointed player-manager of Chelsea, while losers Leicester had now been beaten in all of their six appearances at Wembley.

Semi-finals
First leg

Second leg

Swindon Town won 5–4 on aggregate.

Leicester City won 3–2 on aggregate.

Final

Second Division

Semi-finals
First leg

Second leg

Port Vale won 2–1 on aggregate.

West Bromwich Albion won 3–2 on aggregate.

Final

Third Division

Semi-finals
First leg

Second leg

Crewe Alexandra won 9–3 on aggregate.

York City won 1–0 on aggregate.

Final

External links
Football League website

 
English Football League play-offs